Minneriya (Sinhala: මින්නේරිය) is a small town in Sri Lanka that is famous for two things — the great Minneriya lake built by King Mahasen and Minneriya National Park which is a hot spot for safari lovers because of its abundance of elephants. Furthermore, it is near the tourist-friendly Habarana and the world heritage sites Anuradhapura, Polonnaruwa and Sigiriya.

The area is home to the Infantry Training Centre as well as a training centre of the Military Police of the Sri Lanka Army. The 6th Artillery Regiment is based at Minneriya along with the SLAF base SLAF Hingurakgoda.

External links
Discover Sri Lanka - More information & images about Minneri wewa

Populated places in Anuradhapura District